Julien Quercia (born 17 August 1986) is a French former professional footballer who played as a midfielder or winger for Sochaux, Auxerre, and Lorient.

External links

 

1986 births
Living people
People from Thionville
Sportspeople from Moselle (department)
French footballers
Association football midfielders
France under-21 international footballers
Ligue 1 players
FC Sochaux-Montbéliard players
AJ Auxerre players
FC Lorient players
Footballers from Grand Est